Greek inscriptions similar to "", meaning "[coin] of king of kings Arsaces, the benefactor (Euergetes), the just (Dikaios), the illustrious (Epiphanes), friend of the Greeks (Philhellen)", are found on coins of the Parthian Empire, starting from the reign of Artabanus I. Some variations of this inscription exist. 

The name Arsaces indicates the Arsacid dynasty and appears until the period of Phraates IV.

Transliteration
BASILEOS BASILEON ARSAKOU EUERGETOU DIKAIOU EPIPHANOUS PHILHELLENOS.

Literal translation
Some of the more frequent epithets appearing in the royal formula:
 = Of the King of kings
 = the Great (genitive form)
 = Arsaces (genitive form)
 = Euergetes, the Benefactor (genitive form)
 = Autokratōr, absolute ruler (genitive form)
 = Dikaios, the Just (genitive form)
 = Epiphanes, the Illustrious (genitive form)
 = Philopator, father-loving (genitive form)
 = Philhellene, the Friend of the Greeks (genitive form)

References

Parthian Empire
Greek inscriptions
Parthian coinage